For a list of high school football rivalries, see:

List of high school football rivalries more than 100 years old; or
List of high school football rivalries less than 100 years old

American football-related lists